Via Crucis is an album by Italian pianist and composer Fabio Mengozzi, released in 2022.

Track listing
 Notte nell'orto del Getsemani – 2:17 
 Gesù è tradito e condannato a morte – 1:46
 Gesù è caricato della croce – 4:07
 Gesù cade per la prima volta – 2:06
 Gesù incontra sua madre – 1:48
 Simone di Cirene aiuta Gesù a portare la croce – 1:32
 Veronica asciuga il volto di Gesù – 1:28
 Gesù cade per la seconda volta – 1:14
 Gesù incontra le donne piangenti di Gerusalemme – 2:23
 Gesù cade per la terza volta – 1:27
 Gesù è spogliato delle vesti – 1:06
 Gesù è inchiodato sulla croce – 2:28
 Gesù muore in croce – 3:34
 Gesù è deposto dalla croce – 1:11
 Il corpo di Gesù è deposto nel sepolcro – 0:48

References

External links 
 
Via crucis on Spotify

Contemporary classical music albums
2022 albums